Fetty Wap is the debut studio album by American rapper Fetty Wap. It was released on September 25, 2015, by RGF Productions and 300 Entertainment. Both Monty and M80, who were members of the Remy Boyz, contributed as featured guest artists on the album.

The album was supported by four US Billboard Hot 100 top 40 singles: "Trap Queen", "679" featuring Remy Boyz, "My Way" featuring Monty, and "Again". The album's lead single, "Trap Queen" received Two Grammy Award nominations.

Background
In November 2014, Fetty Wap announced that he had signed a deal to 300 Entertainment, which resulted from the re-release of his popular debut single "Trap Queen", which charted at number 2 on the US Billboard Hot 100.

Singles
Fetty Wap's commercial debut single, called "Trap Queen" was released through iTunes on December 15, 2014. The song was produced by Tony Fadd. "Trap Queen" became Fetty Wap's first entry on the US Billboard Hot 100, becoming a top 10 single, peaking at number 2. It also peaked within the top 10 of various countries, including Belgium, Denmark and the United Kingdom. To date, the song is certified diamond by the Recording Industry Association of America (RIAA).

The album's second single, called "679" was released on June 29, 2015. The song features guest verses from the Remy Boyz, who is an East Coast hip hop group that Wap created, with production by Peoples. The song became Wap's third top 10 single in the United States, reaching at number 4. The album version of the song omits P-Dice's verse, only featuring Monty. To date, the song was certified three-time platinum by the Recording Industry Association of America (RIAA).

The album's third single, called "My Way" premiered from Fetty Wap's SoundCloud on July 17, 2015. The song features guest verse from a local American rapper Monty, with the production by NickEBeats. The song was later remixed, with a guest verse from Canadian rapper Drake. The song peaked at number 7 on the US Billboard Hot 100, after jumping from 87 to the top 10. To date, the song was certified platinum by the Recording Industry Association of America (RIAA).

Wap released the album's fourth and final single, called "Again" on August 13, 2015, after the song premiered previously via Soundcloud. Peoples also produced this track as well, alongside the additional production by Shy Boogs. The song reached at number 33 on the US Billboard Hot 100. To date, the song was certified gold by the Recording Industry Association of America (RIAA).

Promotional singles
"RGF Island" and "Jugg" featuring Monty, were both made available for purchase via the album on September 22, 2015, as promotional singles. To date, the track "RGF Island" was certified gold by the Recording Industry Association of America (RIAA). These former songs have previously appeared on his mixtape Zoo Style.

Critical reception

Fetty Wap was met with generally favorable reviews upon release. At Metacritic, which assigns a normalized rating out of 100 to reviews from music critics, the album has received an average score of 68, indicating "generally favorable reviews", based on 11 reviews. The Guardian'''s Paul MacInnes wrote: "there is enough modern romance and melodic sense (and quirkiness, such as the mumbled hook of Time) to make a decent album-within-an-album, and to mark Fetty Wap as a winning new talent in hip-hop." Meaghan Garvey in Pitchfork Media thought: "as a whole, Fetty Wap adopts the same self-assured stance: Fetty's formula definitely ain't broke, and he doesn't seem in a hurry to fix it." For Colin Joyce of Spin, Wap "shows the consistency to scatter those songs throughout Fetty Wap's 17 tracks and to mostly stick to the limited formula that made them hit as hard as they did on the rest of the record."

In a mixed review, XXL staff wrote: "Fetty’s attempt at putting together a full, formal project takes away from the overall prestige of his hits that have been so cherished over the past 12 months. This isn’t to say that the next album will won’t be able to more effectively balance hits and album cuts. But this one feels like the first attempt that it is." Giving the album three-out-of-five stars, Rolling Stone editor Jon Dolan opined: "with a set list running up to 20 songs, it borders on Fetty overkill, but there are plenty of fine moments you haven't heard yet."

Year-end lists
The album was featured on NMEs "Albums of the Year 2015" list at number 30. It also appeared on Complex "Best Albums of 2015" list at number 40, with the editors commenting "Fetty is the hero we didn’t know we needed, a true underdog with vocal contortion and insane melodies being his super powers."

Commercial performance
The album debuted at number one on the US Billboard 200, with 129,000 album-equivalent units (75,000 in pure album sales) in its first week. In its second week, the album fell to number 4 on the Billboard 200, with 64,000 album-equivalent units (22,000 copies). As of March 2016, the album has sold 300,000 copies in the United States. In March 2016, the album was certified platinum by the Recording Industry Association of America (RIAA) for combined sales and album-equivalent units of over a million units.

In 2015, Fetty Wap was ranked as the 60th most popular album of the year on the Billboard 200.

Track listingNotes'  signifies a co-producer.
 The album version of the song "679" omits P-Dice's verse, only featuring Monty, with another verse by Fetty Wap.
 The album version of the song "How We Do Things" omits P-Dice's verse, only featuring Monty.

Personnel
Credits for Fetty Wap'' adapted from AllMusic.

Olasoji Adenuga – producer
Nick E Beats – producer
Frenzy Beatz – producer
Tony Fadd – producer
Fetty Wap – primary artist
Pascal Blais-Scherer – producer
Brian "Peoples" Garcia – engineer, mixing, producer
Danny "Su" Griffin – executive producer
Jarrod Lacy – mastering
Jay France –  producer
M80 – featured artist
Monty – featured artist
Davon Phillips – producer
Nate Rhoads – producer
Frank Robinson – executive producer
Salik Singletary – producer
Bernard "2GZ" Smith – executive producer
Edward Timmons – assistant engineer, guitar, producer
Treadway – producer
Virgilio Tzaj – art direction
Diwang Valdez – photography
Yung Lan – producer

Charts and certifications

Weekly charts

Year-end charts

Decade-end charts

Certifications

References

External links
 

2015 debut albums
Fetty Wap albums